Richard Zane Smith (born 1955) is a Wyandot sculptor who grew up in St. Louis Missouri and learned the art of pottery at the Kansas City Art institute. Smith's works draw from his ancient Wyandotte heritage as well as Pueblo inspired designs that incorporate coils and layers within the clay. Smith utilizes the influences of many Southwestern pottery styles, including the Navajo and the Ancient Puebloans.

Personal life 
Richard Zane Smith was born in 1955 and is from the Wyandot families of Kansas and related to several Wyandotte families in Oklahoma . Born in and Army Hospital in Augusta Georgia and grew up in and near St. Louis, Missouri. Smith specialized in ceramics when he attended the Kansas City Art institute.

Smith was introduced to art at a young age. He and his four siblings would gather around and listen to many stories told by their parents throughout their childhood. Smith found an interest in clay during his high school years. In addition to clay, Smith would work with many natural materials, such as wood, leather, and stone, and the main media for his art was clay. During these same years, Smith also formed an interest with his Wyandot roots.

Smith is involved in the rebirth of the Wyandot language . Having gone into disuse in the 1960s, Smith began studying and teaching the language to Wyandotte people of Kansas and those who live in northeastern Oklahoma.

Cultural inspiration 
In 1978, Smith traveled to Arizona where he worked as an art instructor at a Navajo mission school. This was his first contact with native clays and Ancient Puebloan (or anasazi) potsherds and fragments. He incorporated such ideas into his works and bore a new style of pottery. Smith's pottery has been described as reminiscent of pre-historic corrugated pottery (pottery where the coils made to form the shape of the pot are left exposed and are rough textured) from the southwest as well as resembling the ancient basket-works of the Wyandot people. It is also cited as being unique to Smith as well as a representation of his roots in Anasazi pottery as well as his Wyandot heritage.

Select artworks 

 “Op-Art” Geometric Design Jar (2000)
 Corrugated Bowl with Wood/Rock Handle (2005)
 Garden Set of 6 Pieces (2001)
 Bury my Heart at Auschwitz (1995)
 Bear Baiting an Indian (2017)

Exhibitions 

 Native American Art, Philbrook Museum of Art
 The American Craft Museum International Tour
 The American Craft Museum
Denver Art Museum
 "Breaking the Surface",  Heard Museum
San Diego Museum of Man

Collections 

 Philbrook Museum of Art
 The American Craft Museum
 Denver Art Museum
 "The Last Drop: Intoxicating Pottery, Past and Present"

Honors and awards 

 "Best of Pottery Award", Heard Museum's Annual American Art juried Competition
 2010 "Community Spirit Award", First Peoples Fund
Richard Zane Smith no longer participates in competitions against other artists.

See also 

Wyandot language

References

External links
Oral History Interview with Richard Zane Smith

1955 births
Living people
American people of Wyandot descent
Sculptors from Missouri